Damlacık can refer to:

 Damlacık, Kahta
 Damlacık, Tavas